Lunacy Act (with its variations) is a stock short title used in the United Kingdom for legislation relating to mental illness.

List
The Lunacy Act 1845

The Lunacy (Scotland) Acts 1857 to 1887 was the collective title of the following Acts:
The Lunacy (Scotland) Act 1857 (20 & 21 Vict c 71)
The Lunacy (Scotland) Act 1862 (25 & 26 Vict c 54)
The Lunacy (Scotland) Act 1868 (29 & 30 Vict c 51)
The Criminal and Dangerous Lunatics (Scotland) Amendment Act 1871 (34 & 35 Vict c 55)
The Lunacy Districts (Scotland) Act 1887 (50 & 51 Vict c 39)

The Lunacy (Ireland) Acts 1821 to 1890 was the collective title of the following Acts:
The Lunacy (Ireland) Act 1821 (1 & 2 Geo 4 c 33)
The Lunacy (Ireland) Act 1826 (7 Geo 4 c 14)
The Criminal Lunatics (Ireland) Act 1838 (1 & 2 Vict c 27)
The Private Lunatic Asylums (Ireland) Act 1842 (5 & 6 Vict c 123)
The Central Criminal Lunatic Asylum (Ireland) Act 1845 (8 & 9 Vict c 107)
The Lunatic Asylums (Ireland) Act 1846 (9 & 10 Vict c 115)
The Trustee Act 1850 (13 & 14 Vict c 60)
The Trustee Act 1852 (15 & 16 Vict c 55)
The Lunatic Asylums Repayment of Advances (Ireland) Act 1855 (18 & 19 Vict c 109)
The Lunatic Asylums Superannuations (Ireland) Act 1856 (19 & 20 Vict c 99)
The Lunacy (Ireland) Act 1867 (30 & 31 Vict c 118)
The Lunatic Asylums (Ireland) Accounts Audit Act 1868 (31 & 32 Vict c 97)
The Lunacy Regulation (Ireland) Act 1871 (34 & 35 Vict c 22)
The Private Lunatic Asylums (Ireland) Act 1874 (37 & 38 Vict c 74)
The Lunatic Asylums (Ireland) Act 1875 (38 & 39 Vict c 67)
The Lunactic Asylums Loans (Ireland) Act 1878 (41 & 42 Vict c 24)
The Pauper Lunatic Asylums (Ireland) Superannuation Act 1890 (53 & 54 Vict c 31)

See also
List of short titles

References

Lists of legislation by short title and collective title